Caitlin E. Buck (born 1964) is a British archaeologist and statistician specialising the application of Bayesian statistics to archaeology, and known for her work in radiocarbon dating. She is a professor in the Department of Mathematics and Statistics at the University of Sheffield.

References

External links

Living people
1964 births
People from Peterborough
British archaeologists
British statisticians
British women archaeologists
Women statisticians
Academics of the University of Sheffield
Alumni of the University of Bradford
Alumni of the University of Nottingham